Pannai, Panai or Pane was a Buddhist kingdom located on the east coast of Northern Sumatra that existed between the 11th and 14th centuries. The kingdom was located on the Barumun River and Panai River valleys, in today's Labuhan Batu and South Tapanuli regencies. Because surviving inscriptions and historical records of this period are scarce, the kingdom is among the least known political entities in Indonesian history. Historians suggest that Pannai was probably a principality or a vassal allied under the Srivijayan mandala and later to Dharmasraya kingdom.

The historical records mentioning this kingdom derived from Indian and Javanese sources. The state of Pannai, with river runs through it, was mentioned in the Tanjore inscription dating from the 11th century, as one of the polity sacked by Rajendra Chola I of Chola dynasty during his campaign against the prosperous Srivijaya. Three centuries later, Prapanca confirmed Pannai as one of the Malay states targeted in Majapahit's foreign diplomacy.

Despite the lack of local historical records, on the upstream of these rivers however, 16 Buddhist Vajrayana temples were discovered. These temples are known today as the Padanglawas temple compounds, with one specifically known as the Bahal temple. Experts suggest that the existence of the temples is linked to the Kingdom of Pannai. The temples constitute tangible traces of Vajranaya Buddhism in Sumatra.

The state of Pannai, according to Thanjavur inscription found in India, fell after a surprise attack from the rear. Pannai did not suspect an attack from a Chola occupied Srivijaya, the mandala's capital.

Historian suggests, that it is likely that the past Padang Lawas area was more fertile than it is now. Therefore the Panai Kingdom was rich in forest products, especially camphor and livestock, and might also produce gold. Only the rich and prosperous society were able to build temples like Bahal temple complex. In Armenian-language travel records, Indian City Names and Persian Suburbs, Pane is referred to as the port where much high-quality camphor can be found. Camphor originated from two ports, namely Barus on the west coast of Sumatra, and P’anes or P’anis, namely Panai on the east coast.

Historiography 

The existence of this kingdom was first mentioned in Thanjavur inscription written in Tamil dated from 1025 and 1030. The inscription created by Rajendra Chola I, king of Cholamandala kingdom, Chola Dynasty, in South India, mentioned about Chola invasion of Srivijaya. This inscription mentioned Pannai with its water ponds was among the conquered cities during Rajendra Chola I campaign against Srivijaya.

Other than Pannai, the Chola invasion also claimed Malaiyur, Ilongasogam, Madamalingam, Ilamuri-Desam, and Kadaram. The inclusion of Pannai together with other port cities being invaded during Chola campaign against Srivijaya suggested that Pannai was a member of the Srivijayan mandala.

The only local source mentioning the name Panai is the Panai inscription, discovered by the Biaro Bahal temple complex, in Padang Lawas regency, North Sumatra. The 10th line of the inscription contains the word Panai. There is also a mention of the word kuti in the inscription which probably refer to the Buddhist temple nearby, called as biaro by current local community. The title of haji accompanying the word kuti indicates that there is a small kingdom ruled by a haji or a lesser king, which was posthumously dedicated in the Bahal temple. In other words, historian conclude that Pannai was probably a small kingdom ruled by a king with honorific title Haji, which was the adherent of Buddhism. In ancient Indonesia, the title haji or aji refers to a regional ruler, a lesser king, a vassal, or a subordinate ruler in contrast to the paramount Maharaja (Chakravartin). To date, Panai inscription is the only remaining local primary historical source of the kingdom. Unfortunately much of the writings in this inscription is unreadable due to its poor condition.

Three centuries later, the name of the kingdom reappeared in Javanese source, the Nagarakretagama, written by Mpu Prapanca from Majapahit Empire dated 1365 (or 1287 Saka year). In Nagarakretagama canto 13, Pane is mentioned as one of Sumatran kingdoms held under Majapahit influence. Javanese overlordship upon Malay states in Sumatra was probably initiated through Singhasari's Pamalayu expedition that pull Malayu Dharmasraya into Singhasari mandala orbit. Therefore, all of Dharmasraya's vassal states were also recruited within Javanese Singhasari mandala. These states includes Palembang, Teba, Kandis, Kahwas, Minangkabau, Siak, Rokan, Kampar, Pane, Kampe, Haru, Mandailing, Tamiyang, Perlak, Padang Lawas, Samudra, Lamuri, Batan, Lampung and Barus, all were under Singhasari influence later inherited by its successor state, Majapahit.

Historical sites

Historians and archaeology experts tried to locate the kingdom mentioned in these historical sources. The similar-sounding names directing them into the estuarine of Panai River and also nearby Barumun River on the east coast of today North Sumatra province, facing Malacca Strait. The toponymy Panai is still can be found toda in several areas in North Sumatra. In Labuhanbatu Regency there are Central Panai District, Panai Hulu District and Panai Hilir District. All three are located on the east coast of Sumatra, close to the Malacca Strait.

In 1846 Franz Junghuhn, a geology expert under Commission of Dutch East Indies authority reported the discovery of temple compound in Padanglawas area, upstream of Barumun River. This vast and empty savanna-like area dotted with Biaro, a local name for temple, obviously derived from Sanskrit vihara. These red brick structures — most of them are in ruins — was once the spiritual center of Pannai Kingdom. The most well-preserved temple within this Padanglawas temple compounds is Bahal temple.

Padanglawas area is a dry lowland basin with savanna-like climate. It is unlikely that this area was once support a dense habitation, and probably only used for religious purposes. Although this area is quite accessible by river or land routes, the dry climate of Padanglawas could not support agriculture villages. Therefore, it is suggested that the habitation area of the people that supported Padanglawas culture was located elsewhere. Probably near the estuarine of Barumun and Panai river and not located near these temples. It is suggested that the center of Pannai Kingdom was located in the more fertile area and much closer to maritime trade route of Malacca Strait, which pointing into the estuarine of Panai and Barumun river.

Despite its rich archaeological value, unlike the popular temples of Java, the Padanglawas temples are mostly neglected and in the state of ruins. There are some attempts to promote the temples as a tourism attraction, however because of its remote location and poor infrastructure, promotion and tourism activity is limited.

Other than the temple complex, some archaeological artifact has been discovered in the area. A bronze statue of Buddha Amitabha was found in the main temple of Pamutung, Padang Lawas. This bronze image demonstrate Sri Lankan style, it was presumably imported from Sri Lanka to Sumatra. This is one of a few artifacts linked to the Pannai Kingdom. This statue is now a collection of Tropenmuseum in the Netherlands.

Possible connection with Panay
The similarity of names between Pannai kingdom and Panay island in the Philippines has raised some suggestions that the two might be related. This suggestion however, is hard to prove due to lack of historical evidences. According to Visayan legends and epics, the people of the island of Panay and the Visayans of the Philippines, trace their ancestry from the state of Pannai which the island of Panay is said to have been named after. The Visayans themselves being descendants of the Sri-Vijayan datus who refused to bow to the Tamil occupation of Maharajah Rajendra Chola or the Hindu rule of the Rajahs that came thereafter.

Panay island in the Philippines is said to have been named after the state of Pannai, of which Visayan (descendants of Srivijayans) oral legends recount that their 10 Datus or Datuks (in Malay) that transited from Borneo, rebelled against the Rajah named Makatunao. Thus, mirroring the situation in Pannai-proper, which fell under the Hindu Chola dynasty, to whom the Datus of the Visayan legend (Maragtas) refused to bow. Instead of bowing to the Maharajah's and his puppet rajah's domination, these Datus set out to other islands, together with their constituent nobles, soldiers and scholars, and never again to return. The Kedatuan of Madja-as may be thus considered as the successor-nation to the Pannai-state, since this previous State itself underwent dissolution after the siege and eventual annexation by the indianized Majapahit Empire.

Pannai was a militant nation allied under the empire-mandala of the Srivijaya that defended the conflict-ridden Strait of Malacca. The small kingdom repulsed any unlicensed Chinese, Indian or Arab navies that often warred in or pirated the straits of Malacca and for a small nation, they were adept at taking down armadas larger than itself. They were successful in policing and defending the straights of Malacca for the Srivijaya until the Chola invasion of Srivijaya occurred, where in a surprise attack from behind, originating from the occupied capital, rendered the militant-state of Pannai vulnerable from an unprotected assault from the back flank. The Chola invaders eventually destroyed the state of Pannai and its surviving soldiers, royals and scholars were said to have been secreted-out eastwards. The high-borne scholars, soldiers and nobles of Pannai, "fled to other islands." Some of whom, now known as Suludnon, settled (and the named the island after Panni) in Panay island in Visayas in Philippines. Some historians also affirm the Sumatran origin of the people of Panay, observing that the Visayans derived their writing system from those of Toba, Borneo, Celebes, Ancient Java and from the Edicts of the ancient Indian emperor Ashoka. The very probable proof of Sumatran origin of the Malay settlement in Panay is the account of P. Francisco Colin, S.J, a historian who came to Asia during the early years of the Spanish conquest of the Philippines. The following is his personal observation recorded during his visit to Sumatra:

There is also religious and linguistic evidence that the people of Panay island are descendants from the people of Pannai in Sumatra as well as the people of Srivijaya ruled Borneo since there are a lot Sanskrit words in the Visayan language and that Visayans, even people from Panay island, used to refer to their Pre-Christian gods as "Diwatas" which is Hindu-Buddhist in origin. This echoes the culture of Srivijayan Pannai which is a Hindu-Buddhist fusion but albeit leaning more to the Buddhist spectrum.

P. Francisco Colin, S.J., a Spanish historian during the early years of Iberian colonization of the Philippines (c.1605), recorded the following account of his visit to Sumatra, which preserved certain fragments of what happened to the State of Pannai in the previous centuries:

"In the middle of Sumatra, there is a spacious and extensive lake (presumably Lake Toba near Pannai), around the shore of which many and several ethnic groups settle, [and] from where, in the past, there was a forced exodus of inhabitants [constraining them] to sail to and to settle in various islands. One of these ethnic groups was subjugated there and they were unable to flee for various circumstances. Someone speaking pampango (which I heard before) found out that they were not speaking pampango among themselves, but they (the Malays of Sumatra) donned the old pampango ethnic costume. And when he addressed an old man among them, the [old man] replied: You are descendants of the lost, that in times past left this place to settle in other lands, and nothing was heard about them again." So, Colin concluded that the Tagalogs and Pampangos, and other political or ethnic groups (meaning: Visayans and other relatively civilized groups), by symbols used in expressing language, by color of dress and costume, one can believe that these came from parts of Borneo and Sumatra.

See also 

Melayu Kingdom
Dharmasraya
Aru Kingdom
Buddhism in Indonesia

References 

Former countries in Indonesian history
Srivijaya
North Sumatra
History of Sumatra
Precolonial states of Indonesia
11th-century establishments in Asia
14th-century disestablishments in Asia